Leila Rodríguez Stahl (born March 30, 1942 San José, Costa Rica) is a Costa Rican public figure, painter, sculptor and winner of the Miss Costa Rica beauty pageant in 1960. She served as the First Lady of Costa Rica from 2002 until 2006 during the presidency of her husband, Abel Pacheco.

Biography 
Rodriguez was born to Yurán Rodríguez Rodríguez and Leila Stahl Navarro in San José, Costa Rica on March 30, 1942. She is the third of her parents four children. Rodriguez attended primary school at Escuela Vitalia Madrigal. She initially enrolled at Colegio Superior de Señoritas for secondary school, but later transferred to Colegio Sagrado Corazón de Jesús in San José. She then attended Escuela Boston and the American Business Academy. Rodriguez also studied art and painting at a school in Chicago, Illinois, where she lived for five years.

Rodríguez married Abel Pacheco, the future President of Costa Rica, on November 20, 1975. Rodríguez and Pacheco had one son, Fabian. Abel Pacheco also had five children from his first marriage: Abel, Elsa, Yolanda, Sergio and Valeria.

She held at least four major art exhibitions during the 1990s, including two at the Club Unión in 1991 and 1995, the Galería Valanti in 1993, and an exhibition called III Encuentro de Primeras Damas de América y el Caribe in 1993. A restropective of her work, Paisajes y bodegones, featuring landscape paintings and still lifes, opened at the Cultural Center of Chile in Los Yoses, Costa Rica, on October 25, 2002.

Rodríguez served as First Lady of Costa Rica from 2002 to 2006. Under Rodríguez, the Office of First Lady promoted Costa Rican history and national identity by focusing on three areas: culture, beautification and the arts, and the environment. The focus of her program, which was extended nationwide, varied depending on the local culture and history of the individual cantons. Her office also coordinated other programs, including an eye clinic and construction of a school for children with neurological disabilities, and supported four foundations: Mundo Solidario, Mundo de Opportunidades, Mundo de Luz, and Cadena Mayor. The Office of First Lady receives no national funding from the government of Costa Rica. In response, Rodríguez solicited private donations to fund her programs and hired some of the office's 60 person staff pro bono.

References

1942 births
Costa Rican beauty pageant winners
Costa Rican expatriates in the United States
Costa Rican painters
Costa Rican women artists
Costa Rican sculptors
First ladies and gentlemen of Costa Rica
Living people
Miss Universe 1960 contestants
People from Chicago
People from San José, Costa Rica
Costa Rican women painters